McClellan Heights, located in York County, Pennsylvania, United States, is a neighborhood adjacent to the city of York and is part of the campus of the York College of Pennsylvania.

References

Unincorporated communities in Pennsylvania